The Halberstadt C.III was a German single-engined reconnaissance biplane of World War I, built by Halberstädter Flugzeugwerke.

Design
The Halberstadt C.III was a structurally similar C.I equipped with a Benz Bz.IV engine with a power of 200 hp. The aircraft's armament consisted of one front 7.92-mm machine gun LMG 08/15 Spandau and one turret 7.92-mm machine gun Parabellum mounted in the rear cockpit on a mobile turret. It was developed into the Halberstadt C.V in late 1918.

Operators

Luftstreitkrafte

Specifications

See also

References

External links

Military aircraft of World War I
1910s German military reconnaissance aircraft
C.III
Single-engined tractor aircraft
Biplanes
Aircraft first flown in 1917